Li Jiahao (born 22 June 2001) is a Chinese footballer currently playing as a midfielder for Guangzhou.

Club career
Li started playing football in 2012, and was initially a ball boy for Guangzhou, who he would go on to sign for.

Career statistics

Club
.

References

2001 births
Living people
Chinese footballers
Association football midfielders
Chinese Super League players
Guangzhou F.C. players
21st-century Chinese people